As of 2006, an estimated 36,000 British people live in China, including those living in Hong Kong, a special administrative region of China. A different estimate puts the number of Britons in China (including Hong Kong) at 3,752,031, the majority of which are those in Hong Kong who have continued to possess British nationality, particularly the British nationals (overseas) status, which numbered 3.4 million as of 2007.

As of the 2011 Hong Kong Census, there were 33,733 Britons in Hong Kong.

Education
British international schools in Mainland China include:

Beijing:
 British School of Beijing, Sanlitun
 British School of Beijing, Shunyi
 Dulwich College Beijing
 Harrow International School Beijing
 Pennon Foreign Language School, Beijing
 International School of Beijing (Formed by a merger of the British Embassy School)
 Beijing Rego British School (closed)
Guangdong:
 British School of Guangzhou
 Bromsgrove School Mission Hills (Shenzhen)
 Dulwich International High School Zhuhai
Jiangsu:
 Wycombe Abbey International School of Changzhou (former Oxford International College of Changzhou)
 British School of Nanjing
 Dulwich College Suzhou
 Dulwich International High School Suzhou
Shandong:
 Malvern College Qingdao
Shanghai:
 Nord Anglia International School Shanghai Pudong
 The British International School Shanghai, Puxi Campus
 Dulwich College Shanghai
 Harrow International School Shanghai
 Wellington College International Shanghai
 Shanghai Rego International School (Closed_
Sichuan:
 Malvern College Chengdu
 Oxford International College of Chengdu

Tianjin:
 Wellington College International Tianjin
 Tianjin Rego International School (Closed)

British schools in Hong Kong include:
 Harrow International School Hong Kong
 Kellett School 
 Malvern College Hong Kong
 South Island School

Notable personalities

 Lee and Oli Barrett - social media personalities

References

British diaspora in Asia
+
European diaspora in China
+